St. Stephen's Armenian Elementary School, located in Watertown, Massachusetts, was founded in 1985. It is a small Armenian private school.

History
The school was founded to provide the Armenian Community of the Greater Boston Area with a place where children could learn to read, write and speak Armenian.
The school is associated with the St. Stephen's Armenian Apostolic Church.

Location

Faculty

Curriculum

Sources
 SSAES.org: official school website
 Armenian Weekly: St Stephen's Armenian Elementary School to Celebrate 35 Years (October 22, 2019)
 St. Stephen's Armenian Apostolic Church of Greater Boston: SSAES
 ANCA.org (Armenian National Committee of America) St Stephen's Armenian Elementary School to Celebrate 30 Years (March 22, 2016)

Armenian-American culture in Massachusetts
Private elementary schools in Massachusetts
Armenian-American private schools
Buildings and structures in Watertown, Massachusetts
Schools in Middlesex County, Massachusetts
1985 establishments in Massachusetts
Educational institutions established in 1985